Kine Moor is a settlement in the English county of South Yorkshire.

Kine Moor is part of the metropolitan borough of Barnsley and the civil parish of Silkstone.

External links 

Villages in South Yorkshire